The Mauritius national beach soccer team represents Mauritius in international beach soccer competitions and is controlled by the MFA, the governing body for football in Mauritius. The Mauritius national beach soccer team played their first game, a FIFA Beach Soccer World Cup qualifier, in July 2009, losing 0–13 to Nigeria. Their first win came in the 2009 Festisable du Tampon, which took place in Réunion, in which Mauritius won against the hosts 3–2.

Current squad
Correct as of 2011

 

Coach: Eddy Rose

Current Staff
 Head of Delegation: Nanda Kistnen

Awards and competition records

Festisable du Tampon record
 2009 — 2nd
 2011 — 4th

CAF Beach Soccer Championship record
 2006–2008 — Did not participate
 2009 — 9th
 2011 — Did not participate

FIFA Beach Soccer World Cup record
 1995–2008 — Did not participate
 2009 — Did not qualify
 2011 — Did not participate

Schedule

Recent results

References

External links
 Team Profile

B
African national beach soccer teams